Now Deh (also known as Kalāteh-ye Nowdeh, Kalateh-i-Naudeh, Kalāteh Naudeh, Kalāt-e Nowdeh, Kūh-e Nowdeh, and Kalāteh-ye Nūdeh) is a village in Shaskuh Rural District, Central District, Zirkuh County, South Khorasan Province, Iran. At the 2006 census, its population was 160, in 41 families.

References 

Populated places in Zirkuh County